A Shenandoah, also known as an Amish beard, a chin curtain, a Donegal, a Lincoln, a spade beard, or a whaler, is a style of facial hair.

The hair is grown full and long over the jaw and chin, meeting the sideburns, while the hair above the mouth is shaved. 

This facial hair style is popular among followers of certain sects of Islam, as they believe it is how the Islamic prophet Muhammad wore his beard, citing the relevant hadith compiled by Muhammad al-Bukhari, "Cut the mustaches short and leave the beard".

In the United States, this beard style is common among married Amish men. Male members of the sect generally grow a beard after baptism, but shave the mustache off.

Gallery

See also
 List of facial hairstyles

References

External links

Beard styles